George Hugh Castleden (23 July 1895 – 25 April 1969) was a Co-operative Commonwealth Federation member of the House of Commons of Canada. He was born in Moosomin, Northwest Territories and became a teacher by career.

He was first elected at the Yorkton riding in the 1940 general election then re-elected in 1945. In the 1949 election he was defeated by Alan Carl Stewart of the Liberal Party.

Stewart did not seek another term in Yorkton, allowing Castleden to unseat the new Liberal candidate Patrick Sheehan O'Dwyer in the 1953 election. Castleden won a consecutive re-election in 1957, but was defeated by Gordon Drummond Clancy of the Progressive Conservative Party in the 1958 election.

External links
 

1895 births
1969 deaths
Co-operative Commonwealth Federation MPs
20th-century Canadian legislators
Members of the House of Commons of Canada from Saskatchewan